Hilburn is an unincorporated community in Castro County, Texas, United States.

Notes

Unincorporated communities in Castro County, Texas
Unincorporated communities in Texas